Fairport's Cropredy Convention (formerly Cropredy Festival) is an annual festival of folk and rock music, headed by British folk-rock band Fairport Convention and held on the edge of the village of Cropredy in Oxfordshire, England. The festival has taken place in August annually since 1976.

Fairport's Cropredy Convention attracts up to 20,000 people each year. The festival features a single stage at the lower end of the sloping arena field. There are also ancillary events, such as Morris dancing in the streets and live music at the village's two pubs.

History

The festival began as a private performance to about 750 people by the British folk rock band Fairport Convention in a village back garden in July 1976. The next year the performance was repeated and opened up to the public. In 1978 it was properly organised and moved to a larger site behind the Cropredy village school.  It became a significant event in the band's history as they played their farewell performance there on 4 August 1979 to around 4,500 people, who were cheered by a promise to continue with annual reunions. From this point the festival became the main mechanism for preserving the identity of the band and for their many fans to show their appreciation.

At the first reunion in 1980 the festival was expanded from a one to a two-day event with increasing numbers of guest acts. In 1981, lacking a suitable site at Cropredy, it was shifted to the grounds of Broughton Castle, a performance released as Moat on the Ledge – Live at Broughton Castle (1982).

The festival returned to Cropredy the next year (and has remained there ever since although the actual site has expanded over the years). Despite the fact that Fairport Convention was not active as a band from 1980 to 1985, the festival continued to grow. After the band reformed in 1985, the festival became Fairport's major platform for showcasing new material as well as revisiting the old.

Between 1981 and 1999, the festival was a two-day event. From 2000, it was expanded to three days—Thursday, Friday and Saturday. The festival takes place on the second full weekend in August. Originally known as just "the Cropredy reunion", the event was branded Cropredy Festival until 2005 when it was retitled Fairport's Cropredy Convention. In 2007, all available tickets were sold in advance for the first time (this would not happen again until 2014).

In 2008, a live on-stage video screen was introduced. The year was also notable because, for the first time, not a single theft from the campsites was reported to festival control over the whole three days, underlining the unique and friendly atmosphere for which the festival is famous.

In 2010, highlights of the festival were televised on Sky Arts for the first time, with a documentary presented by radio DJ and television presenter Bob Harris. This continued through to 2012. In 2013 and 2014 the Whispering Bob Broadcasting Company uploaded highlights of the festival on their YouTube channel. From 2015 onwards, highlights from Fairport Convention's Saturday night set have been uploaded on their official YouTube channel. In 2020 the festival did not take place due to the COVID-19 pandemic and so a broadcast of Richard Thompson and Fairport Convention's full sets from the 2019 festival was streamed on the official YouTube channel.

To celebrate forty years of the festival, a documentary called Summer by The Cherwell was released in 2020.

Outline of the festival
The event is organised largely by Gareth Williams, the Festival Director, and also Simon Nicol and Dave Pegg, both members of Fairport. Fairport themselves open the festival on the Thursday evening with an acoustic set, and close the festival on the Saturday night.

The majority of attendees camp for the duration of the festival. There are eight separate camping fields adjacent to the arena, one of which is reserved for family parties. Fairport's Cropredy Convention is aimed at all ages with an emphasis on families and has developed a reputation as a particularly friendly and safe festival.

As well as a wide range of live music, the event features three dozen stalls selling clothing, books, CDs and food. It also boasts a very large bar which specialises in cask ale which is provided by Wadworth, a brewery based in Devizes, Wiltshire. The bar is used by festival-goers and performers alike (there is no back-stage bar), making Cropredy one of the few major festivals where the public can mingle with the musicians playing there.

In recent years, the running times for live music have been 4 p.m. until 11 p.m. on the Thursday and noon until midnight on the Friday and Saturday.

Also recently, there has been a wider spread of genres of music, expanding out from the original folk roots of the festival. Status Quo, the Buzzcocks, Dreadzone and Supergrass have played at Cropredy in recent years. Among many well-known acts appearing in recent years are Robert Plant, Alice Cooper, Lonnie Donegan, Procol Harum, Steeleye Span, Eliza Carthy, Yusuf Islam and Oysterband (see below for others).

The pre-Cropredy "warm-ups"
On the Monday and Tuesday before the festival each year, fans get a foretaste of what is to come at the festival when Fairport Convention stage "warm-up" concerts at a local club venue. Until 2007 these concerts were held at the Mill Arts Centre in Banbury. From 2007 until 2010 the concerts were held at Woodford Halse Social Club (Woodford Halse is a village in Northamptonshire approximately nine miles northeast of Cropredy) but returned to The Mill in 2011.

In 2017 the warm-ups moved from The Mill to Banbury Trades And Labour Club, following in the footsteps of P J Wright (fellow band-member with Dave Pegg in the Dylan Project) who had moved his annual TRADarrr pre-Cropredy Wednesday gig to the same venue in 2016.

The warm-ups are concerts in their own right and also provide Fairport Convention with the chance to rehearse their set for the following Saturday.

Appearances

These performers are generally listed with the headline act last.

2023 
On 12 December 2022 it was announced that the festival would be happening on 10, 11 and 12 August 2023 with headliners 10cc on the Friday and other sets by Toyah & Robert Fripp, Kiki Dee & Carmelo Luggeri, Gilbert O’Sullivan and the UK farewell performance from Strawbs.

2022 
Thursday 11 August 2022
The Trevor Horn Band
Clannad
Edward II
Thumping Tommys
Fairport Convention Acoustic

Friday 12 August 2022
Steve Hackett - Genesis Revisited
Turin Brakes
Sharon Shannon
Slambovian Circus of Dreams
Martyn Joseph
Home Service
Emily Barker
Maddie Morris

Saturday 13 August 2022
Fairport Convention & Friends (inc Full House)
Richard Thompson
The Matthews Baartmans Experience
Rosalie Cunningham
The Bar-Steward Sons of Val Doonican
Holy Moly & The Crackers
Seth Lakeman

2021 
In 2021 the festival did not take place due to the COVID-19 pandemic.

2020 
In 2020 the festival did not take place due to the COVID-19 pandemic.

2019
Thursday 8 August 2019
Fairport Acoustic
Lil'Jim
Tors
Gogol Bordello
The Waterboys

Friday 9 August 2019
The 4 of Us
Wildwood Kin
Will Pound & Eddy Jay
Wilson & Wakeman
Caravan
Seth Lakeman
Richard Thompson & Friends
Frank Turner & the Sleeping Souls

Saturday 10 August 2019
Richard Digance
Daphne's Flight
Tide Lines
Zal Cleminson's /sin'dogs/
Martin Barre Band plays 50 years of Jethro Tull
Martin Simpson
Fairport Convention & Friends

2018
Thursday 9 August 2018
Fairport Acoustic
Smith & Brewer
Police Dog Hogan
Oysterband
Brian Wilson Presents Pet Sounds

Friday 10 August 2018
Mera Royle & friends (Scran) (BBC R2 YFA Winner)
Midnight Skyracer
The Travelling Band
Cregan & Co
Le Vent Du Nord
Fish
Kate Rusby
Levellers

Saturday 11 August 2018
Richard Digance
Eric Sedge
The Bar-Steward Sons of Val Doonican
Will Varley
Sam Kelly & The Lost Boys
Afro Celt Sound System
Al Stewart
Fairport Convention & Friends

2017
Thursday 10 August 2017
Fairport Acoustic Convention
Feast of Fiddles
Show of Hands
The Trevor Horn Band
The Divine Comedy

Friday 11 August 2017
Josie Duncan and Pablo Lafuente
The Gerry Colvin Band
Quill
Gigspanner Big Band
CC Smugglers
Pierce Brothers
Petula Clark
Richard Thompson

Saturday 12 August 2017
Morris On
Judy Dyble and the Band of Perfect Strangers
Plainsong
Cats in Space
Marillion
Dougie MacLean
Fairport Convention & Friends

1976 to 2016
Appearances prior to 2017 are documented at Fairport's Cropredy Convention appearances

See also

 List of folk festivals
 List of historic rock festivals

References

External links

 Fairport Convention's website
 Guide to Cropredy Festival
 Cropredy Festival at eFestivals
 

1976 establishments in England
English folk music
Folk festivals in the United Kingdom
Music festivals established in 1976
Music festivals in Oxfordshire
Rock festivals in the United Kingdom